Angola–Serbia relations refers to bilateral relations between Angola and Serbia. Angola and Socialist Federal Republic of Yugoslavia established diplomatic relations in 1975, following Angola's independence. Angola has an embassy in Belgrade,  and Serbia has an embassy in Luanda, Alvalade.

History
During the Angolan Civil War, Yugoslavia heavily aided the MPLA, providing military supplies, financial aid, and education for Angolan students and diplomatic training in Belgrade. While Soviet support for the MPLA was turbulent in the mid-1970s, Yugoslavia firmly and constantly aided in the MPLA struggle. Close relations and joint cooperation continued through the breakup of Yugoslavia, and Angola has expressed its strong support for Serbia on the issue of Kosovo.

Cooperations 
The defence minister of Serbia, Dragan Šutanovac, stated in 2011 meeting in Luanda that Serbia is negotiating with the Angolan military authorities for the construction of a new military hospital in the Angola.

See also 
 Foreign relations of Angola 
 Foreign relations of Serbia
 Angola–Yugoslavia relations
 Yugoslavia and the Non-Aligned Movement
 Yugoslavia and the Organisation of African Unity

References

External links 
  Serbian Ministry of Foreign Affairs about relations with Angola
  Serbian Ministry of Foreign Affairs: direction of the Serbian embassy in Alvalade
 
  Serbian Ministry of Foreign Affairs: direction of the Angola embassy in Belgrade

 
Serbia
Bilateral relations of Serbia